The Knights of Marshall are a West African and London Roman Catholic male and female fraternal society, founded .  Named after Sir James Marshall, the Knights of Marshal has been a member of the International Alliance of Catholic Knights (IACK) since 1983.  Separating themselves away from the Knights of Columbus, the Knights of Marshall took Sir James Marshall, a Scotsman and a Catholic layperson as their patron.

Membership of the Knights of Marshall is open to "any literate and practicing Catholic or communicant and between the ages of 18 and 60 years . . . of good character not convicted by any court of competent jurisdiction for an offence involving dishonest or moral turpitude".  Current membership extends to many countries of West Africa, along with London, England.  , the Knights of Marshall is organised into 146 groups, known as Councils, and can be found throughout Ghana, Togo, Benin, Liberia, Sierra Leone, Burkina Faso, Cote d’Ivoire, and England the United Kingdom.

The Knights of Marshall are also members of Unum Omnes, the International Council of Catholic Men.

References

External links
Marshallan.org — official website of the Knights of Marshall

Organizations established in 1925
History of Catholicism in Africa
Catholicism in Africa
Christian organizations based in Africa
International Alliance of Catholic Knights